Ivan Miličević (born 11 February 1988 in Osijek) is a Croatian football forward, who is currently playing for 1. FC Bad Kötzting in Germany.

Career statistics

References

External links
 

Ivan Miličević at Sportnet.hr 
Ivan Miličević at FuPa

1988 births
Living people
Sportspeople from Osijek
Association football forwards
Croatian footballers
Croatia youth international footballers
Croatia under-21 international footballers
NK Osijek players
NK Olimpija Osijek players
San Antonio Scorpions players
NK Istra 1961 players
U.S. Triestina Calcio 1918 players
TSW Pegasus FC players
AZ Picerno players
A.S.D. Sangiovannese 1927 players
U.S. Dro players
HNK Cibalia players
Croatian Football League players
North American Soccer League players
Serie C players
Serie D players
Landesliga players
Croatian expatriate footballers
Expatriate soccer players in the United States
Croatian expatriate sportspeople in the United States
Expatriate footballers in Italy
Croatian expatriate sportspeople in Italy
Expatriate footballers in Hong Kong
Croatian expatriate sportspeople in Hong Kong
Expatriate footballers in Germany
Croatian expatriate sportspeople in Germany